Whose Line Is It Anyway? is a short-form improvisational comedy show originating as a British radio programme, before moving to British television in 1988.   Following the conclusion of the British run in 1999, ABC began airing an American version, which ran until 2007 and was later revived by The CW in 2013.

Each version of the show consists of a panel of four performers who create characters, scenes, and songs on the spot, in the style of short-form improvisation games, many taken from theatresports. Topics for the games are based on either audience suggestions or predetermined prompts from the host. The show ostensibly takes the form of a game show, with the host arbitrarily assigning points and likewise choosing a winner at the end of each episode.

Versions, adaptations and similar shows

See also
Whose Life Is It Anyway? (disambiguation)

References

Whose Line Is It Anyway?
Television franchises